Lycée Suger is a senior high school/sixth-form college in the  area of Saint-Denis, Seine-Saint-Denis, France, within the Paris metropolitan area. The school opened in 1994.

The teachers went on strike in September 2016.

References

External links
 Lycée Suger 

Lycées in Seine-Saint-Denis
1994 establishments in France
Educational institutions established in 1994